The Sauser P6E is an American homebuilt aircraft that was designed and built by Donald Sauser of Tustin, California. The aircraft is an 82% scale reproduction of the 1920s Curtiss P-6 Hawk. When it was available the aircraft was supplied in the form of plans for amateur construction by the Sauser Aircraft Company.

Design and development
Like the aircraft it is patterned after, the Sauser P6E features a strut-braced biplane layout, a single-seat open cockpit with a windshield, fixed conventional landing gear with wheel pants and a single engine in tractor configuration.

The aircraft is made from welded steel tubing and wood, with its flying surfaces covered in doped aircraft fabric.

Operational history
Sauser P6Es have been registered with the US Federal Aviation Administration under a variety of type designations, making them hard to catalog. Types registered include Sauser QC, Johnson F11C-2PJ (built as a F11C-2 replica), Wooldridge Saco P6-E Hawk and Roof Curtis Hawk P6E.

Aircraft on display
March Field Air Museum -  donated by the designer's widow in 2002.

Specifications (Sauser P6E)

References

External links

P6E Replica
1990s United States sport aircraft
Single-engined tractor aircraft
Biplanes
Homebuilt aircraft
Replica aircraft